David Allen Zubik (born September 4, 1949) is an American prelate of the Roman Catholic Church who has been bishop of the Diocese of Pittsburgh in Pennsylvania since 2007.  Zubik previously was the bishop of the Diocese of Green Bay in Wisconsin from 2003 to 2007, and auxiliary bishop of the Diocese of Pittsburgh from 1997 to 2003.

Biography

Early life and education
David Zubik was born on September 4, 1949, in Sewickley, Pennsylvania, to Stanley (1927–2015) and Susan Zubik (née Raskosky; 1925–2006). The grandson of Polish and Slovak immigrants, he is an only child. He was raised in Ambridge, Pennsylvania, and attended St. Stanislaus Church. His parents would take him to a local amusement park after Mass on Sundays.

Zubik first considered pursuing holy orders in the first grade, later contemplating a career in law before returning to his priestly aspirations after attending a retreat in 1965 on the South Side. After graduating from St. Veronica High School in 1967, he entered St. Paul Seminary in Pittsburgh. He earned an undergraduate degree from Duquesne University in Pittsburgh in 1971 and continued his studies at St. Mary's Seminary and University in Baltimore, Maryland, earning a Master of Divinity degree in 1975.

Ordination and Priestly Ministry
Zubik was ordained to the priesthood by Bishop Vincent Leonard on May 3, 1975, for the Diocese of Pittsburgh. His first appointment was as the parochial vicar of Sacred Heart Parish in Shadyside, Pittsburgh, until 1980.  He also served as vice-principal of Quigley Catholic High School in Baden, Pennsylvania, and chaplain to the Sisters of St. Joseph in Baden until 1987. He received a Master of Educational Administration degree from Duquesne University in 1982. From 1987 to 1991, he was secretary to Bishop Anthony Bevilacqua.

Zubik became an associate spiritual director of St. Vincent Seminary in Latrobe, Pennsylvania, in 1989.  With the arrival of Bishop Donald Wuerl to Pittsburgh (in 1988) Zubik was appointed as diocesan director of clergy personnel, serving from 1991 to 1996. 

During this period, Zubik allegedly aided in the cover-up of "predator priests", including Ernest Paone. The 2018 Grand Jury report into clergy abuse found that Zubik knew of the serious allegations of abuse made against Paone, yet Zubik chose not contact the police. Instead, Zubik concealed the allegations in the diocesan confidential files. Zubik became president of the Diocesan Finance Council in 1995. In 1996 Zubik was appointed as vicar general and moderator of the curia for the diocese in 1996.

Auxiliary Bishop of Pittsburgh

On February 18, 1997, Zubik was appointed auxiliary bishop of the Diocese of Pittsburgh and titular bishop of Jamestown by Pope John Paul II. He received his episcopal consecration on April 6, 1997, from then-Bishop  Wuerl, with Bishops Nicholas Dattilo and Thomas Tobin serving as co-consecrators, at St. Paul Cathedral. He selected as his episcopal motto: "Nothing is Impossible with God"  (Luke 1:37).

Bishop of Green Bay

Zubik was named the eleventh bishop of the Diocese of Green Bay on October 10, 2003, replacing Bishop Robert Banks.  Zubik was installed on December 12, 2003. In address to sexual abuse scandals, Zubik met with representatives of the Survivors Network of those Abused by Priests (SNAP), but was criticized by the group for not disclosing the names of priests who were accused of sexual abuse but never sued or charged with a crime.

During the 2004 US presidential election, Zubik urged American Catholics to consider Catholic teachings on abortion rights and same-sex marriage before voting. Although he has said that Catholic politicians who support abortion rights should refrain from receiving communion, Zubik has also stated he would not refuse communion to them. He opposes capital punishment, and supports immigration reform.

Bishop of Pittsburgh
Pope Benedict XVI appointed Zubik the twelfth bishop of the Diocese of Pittsburgh on July 18, 2007.  He was installed on September 28, 2007.

Zubik declined to take up residence at the episcopal mansion in Pittsburgh, which had been the home of the bishops of Pittsburgh since 1949.  He instead moved into Saint Paul Seminary, explained that the Catholic church needed to move away from being "attached to buildings". In April 2009, he held a widely publicized Service of Apology at St. Paul Cathedral, where he begged the "forgiveness of anyone hurt by the Church... in any way." Under  Zubik, the diocese implemented a policy of reporting all allegations of sexual abuse to law enforcement.

Zubik handed off the case of Rev. David Dzermejko to the Vatican after a diocese review board found that allegations of child sexual abuse against Dzermejko were credible. Dzermejko was removed as pastor of Mary, Mother of the Church Parish in Charleroi, Pennsylvania in June 2009 after a couple informed the diocese that he had sexually abused their son. Another man came forward to say that Dzermejko had abused him as a child. Dzermejko was removed within 48 hours of the diocese receiving the first allegation.

Zubik said that neither he nor his predecessor Bishop Wuerl, tried to cover up the sexual abuse of children documented in a grand jury report released by Pennsylvania Attorney General Josh Shapiro. Zubik apologized for the abuse, "In the name of the Church of Pittsburgh, and in my own name, and in the name of my predecessors, we are sorry. I am sorry." Zubik also stated that the details of the report disgusted him. Zubik offered to apologize in person to victims but acknowledged that apologies would not be enough.

The grand jury report stated that Zubik was incorrect in his denial of a church cover up. Zubik responded in a media release, "The Diocese of Pittsburgh is not the church described in the report. That means that the report ignores 30 years of reforms and actions to protect children and identify and remove abusing priests from ministry." ... "The truth is that 90 percent of the incidents of abuse occurred before 1990, and the efforts we have made to protect children—such as turning over allegations to law enforcement, creating the first Independent Review Board and training more than 70,000 people on how to look for and report abuse—have significantly reduced the incidents of abuse."Zubik described the University of Notre Dame's decision to have President Barack Obama deliver its commencement speech and receive an honorary degree as "painful" and "embarrassing," noting that Obama is "the single most outspoken pro-abortion president since the issue was foisted upon the country by the Supreme Court." Zubik is a proponent of "comprehensive immigration reform" stating: "We need to give the immigrants of our century the same latitude that we gave the immigrants of the last century."

Sex abuse lawsuits
On August 7, 2020, it was revealed that Zubik was named as a defendant in a new sex abuse lawsuit which was filed in Allegheny County Common Pleas Court. The lawsuit claims that despite former Pittsburgh Bishop  Wuerl's promise in 1994 that Rev. Leo Burchianti—who was accused of sexually abusing at least eight boys—would not receive a new church assignment, Wuerl and then-Father Zubik gave him a voluntary work assignment at St. John Vianney Manor, a home for retired priests. Burchianti remained there from 1995 to 2012 and died in 2013. Zubik has also been named as a defendant in other sex abuse lawsuits involving the Diocese of Pittsburgh as well.

See also

 Catholic Church hierarchy
 Catholic Church in the United States
 Historical list of the Catholic bishops of the United States
 List of Catholic bishops of the United States
 Lists of patriarchs, archbishops, and bishops
 Zubik v. Burwell — a case before the U.S. Supreme Court on the contraceptive mandate

References

External links
 Roman Catholic Diocese of Pittsburgh
 Office of the Diocesan Bishop
 Roman Catholic Diocese of Green Bay

1949 births
Living people
21st-century Roman Catholic bishops in the United States
American people of Polish descent
American people of Slovak descent
Duquesne University alumni
Religious leaders from Pittsburgh
Roman Catholic bishops of Green Bay
Roman Catholic bishops of Pittsburgh
St. Mary's Seminary and University alumni
People from Sewickley, Pennsylvania